Yamatai is a student-run taiko drumming team at Cornell University. Based in Cornell's Lincoln Hall, they perform for several events on campus and in the northeast region of the United States.

Inspiration
The name Yamatai comes from the Japanese word 邪馬台, named after the ancient kingdom.

Yamatai is heavily influenced by Masataka Kobayashi and his professional taiko group, Bonten. Formerly an employee at a travel agency, Kobayashi opened a taiko class to the public in 1994. This would become the Mirai Taiko Dojo, an institution that still holds classes in Tokyo, Yokohama, and various other cities in the Kantō Plains.

In 1999, Kobayashi established a professional drumming team with members of the Mirai Taiko Dojo. In August 2000, Bonten held their debut performance. Bonten’s repertoire consists of original pieces composed by Kobayashi.

In 2006, Kobayashi visited Cornell to assist the newly established taiko group on campus. Kobayashi donated taiko drums, helped make bachi and stands, and taught a master class to the members. Yamatai dedicated their debut performance on April 1, 2007 to him. Kobayashi continues to assist Yamatai in both musical and organizational aspects.

History
Yamatai was established in September 2006 as Cornell Taiko by an undergraduate, Haruki Yukawa. The group started with one drum, but acquired six more by the following semester with the help of Kobayashi, allowing them to hold their debut performance.

In November 2007, the group premiered their own concert in Goldwin Smith Hall entitled "Yamatai: The Debut." A second concert, entitled "Hibiki: The Resonance," was held the following semester in Statler Hall in March 2008. During that year, Yamatai also performed at ECAASU 2008: ReMix, the Japan-U.S. Association's cultural show, and The Hangovers' spring concert in Sage Chapel.

On March 6, 2009, Bonten came to perform in Bailey Hall. This show featured the founding members of Yamatai, and also served as the professional debut of then-musical director Eva Kestner as a member of Bonten.

In April 2011, Yamatai held what would become the first in a series of annual, sold-out Spring concerts entitled "PULSE." Held in Bailey Hall, this concert featured a new piece by composer Cayenna Ponchione combining Western marimba and flute playing with taiko. Yamatai also collaborated with other student groups such as Cornell Lion Dance, Absolute Zero Breakdance Crew, and Cornell Chinese Music Ensemble for the first time.

During the 2011 - 2012 year, Yamatai hosted former Kodo member Kaoru Watanabe to hold a taiko workshop. The sold out again Bailey Hall for "PULSE 2012," a concert that featured Japanese-American violinist Ryu Goto. This concert also featured a collaboration with Cornell Bhangra.

From 2012 to 2018, Yamatai has further grown in membership and continues to sell out concerts at Bailey Hall. Yamatai has also performed for a full audience at Alice Tully Hall as guests at a Cornell alumni event.

Performances

Concerts
In the past, Yamatai held two annual concerts, one in the fall semester and one in the spring semester. As of 2011, Yamatai only holds one annual concert in the Spring, entitled "PULSE."

Other Performances
Yamatai regularly engages big audiences at events both on and off campus. Venues have included Ithaca's Sciencenter, Binghamton University, and the Washington D.C.'s National Cherry Blossom Festival, as well as Alice Tully Hall in New York City.

East Coast Taiko Conference
Yamatai organized the first annual East Coast Taiko Conference (ECTC) at Cornell University in February 2011. Over one hundred professional and collegiate taiko players were in attendance, including PJ Hirabayashi of San Jose Taiko, Alan and Merle Okada of Soh Daiko, Mark H. Rooney, and Stuart Paton of Burlington Taiko. ECTC has since been held at Wesleyan University in 2012 (as Eastern Taiko Conference), Brown University in 2013, and Skidmore College in 2014.

Repertoire
The group's performances feature the kumi-daiko style popularized by Daihachi Oguchi in the 1950s. While most of Yamatai's current pieces were written by Kobayashi, Yamatai also performs arrangements of traditional pieces, such as Miyake and the Chichibu Yatai-bayashi. Many songs make use of shinobue and keyboard, as well as other instruments.

References

External links
 Yamatai Official Website

Cornell University student organizations
Taiko groups